Handkerchief tree is a common name for several plants and may refer to:

Davidia involucrata
Maniltoa grandiflora